Shurab-e Mahmudvand (also Romanized as Shūrāb-e Maḩmūdvand; also known as Maḩmūdvand and Shūrāb-e Moḩammadvand) is a village in Shurab Rural District, Veysian District, Dowreh County, Lorestan Province, Iran. At the 2006 census, its population was 424, in 111 families.

References 

Towns and villages in Dowreh County